Bahovitsa is a village in Central-North Bulgaria, part of the Lovech Municipality, Lovech Province, about 5 kilometers north of Lovech. As of February 2011, it has a population of 969.

Industry
In February 2012, Great Wall Motors together with the Bulgarian company Litex Motors, opened the first Chinese automobile factory within the European Union in Bahovitsa.

References

Villages in Lovech Province